Knokke station serves Knokke-Heist and Knokke, in West Flanders, Belgium and was built in 1920. Knokke station is run by NMBS and is a terminal station located on the Belgian railway line 51 B from Brugge railway station and has services to Brussels South and beyond to Tongeren.  The Kusttram terminus is located outside the station with trams to Oostende and beyond.

Train services
The station is served by the following services:

Intercity services (IC-03) Knokke - Bruges - Ghent - Brussels - Leuven - Genk

Railway stations in Belgium
Railway stations opened in 1920
Railway stations in West Flanders
Knokke-Heist